Sepiolina nipponensis, also known as the Japanese bobtail squid, is a bobtail squid and one of two species in the genus Sepiolina. It is found in the Western Pacific in apparently widely separated populations, the most southerly of which is in the Great Australian Bight in South Australia and Western Australia, and there are populations from the Philippines northwards to Taiwan, Fujian and southern Honshū.

Description 

The maximum size of adult Japanese bobtail squid is 2.5 cm in mantle length (ML). The body consists of large fins and a short and dome-shaped mantle surrounded by an iridescent belt. The mantle cavity contains subcordate luminous organs. The arms are subequal with biserial suckers.

References

 Sweeney, M. J. and C. F. E. Roper / N. A. Voss, M. Vecchione, R. B. Toll and M. J. Sweeney, eds. (1998). Classification, type localities and type repositories of recent Cephalopoda, Systematics and Biogeography of Cephalopods. Smithsonian Contributions to Zoology, 586 (I-II).

External links
 Tree of Life: Sepiolina nipponensis

Bobtail squid
Molluscs described in 1911
Taxa named by Samuel Stillman Berry